Janina Urszula Korowicka (born 14 April 1954) is a former Polish speed skater, who represented her native country at the 1976 Winter Olympics in Innsbruck, Austria. She is the mother of the German champion speed skater Anni Friesinger-Postma.

External links
 
 Fan site for Korowicka

1954 births
Living people
Polish female speed skaters
Olympic speed skaters of Poland
Speed skaters at the 1976 Winter Olympics
People from Syców
Sportspeople from Lower Silesian Voivodeship